Argentina competed at the 2016 Summer Paralympics in Rio de Janeiro, Brazil, from 7 to 18 September 2016. Wheelchair tennis player Gustavo Fernandez has been chosen to carry the nation's flag at the opening ceremony.

Disability classifications

Every participant at the Paralympics has their disability grouped into one of five disability categories; amputation, the condition may be congenital or sustained through injury or illness; cerebral palsy; wheelchair athletes, there is often overlap between this and other categories; visual impairment, including blindness; Les autres, any physical disability that does not fall strictly under one of the other categories, for example dwarfism or multiple sclerosis. Each Paralympic sport then has its own classifications, dependent upon the specific physical demands of competition. Events are given a code, made of numbers and letters, describing the type of event and classification of the athletes competing. Some sports, such as athletics, divide athletes by both the category and severity of their disabilities, other sports, for example swimming, group competitors from different categories together, the only separation being based on the severity of the disability.

Medalists

The following Argentine competitors won medals at the games. In the by discipline sections below, medalists' names are bolded.

Athletics

Track

Men

Women

Field

Men

Women

Key
Note–Ranks given for track events are within the athlete's heat only
Q = Qualified for the next round
q = Qualified for the next round as a fastest loser or, in field events, by position without achieving the qualifying target
NR = National record
WB= World Best
D/Q = Disqualified
N/A = Round not applicable for the event
Bye = Athlete not required to compete in round

Boccia 

Argentina qualified for the 2016 Summer Paralympics in this sport at the Montreal hosted 2015 BisFed Americas Pair and Team championship in the Teams BC1/BC2 event.  They claimed gold ahead of silver medalist Brazil and bronze medalists Canada.

Individual

Pairs and teams

Cycling

With one pathway for qualification being one highest ranked NPCs on the UCI Para-Cycling male and female Nations Ranking Lists on 31 December 2014, Argentina qualified for the 2016 Summer Paralympics in Rio, assuming they continued to meet all other eligibility requirements.

Road

Men

Women

Track

Pursuit

Time trial

Equestrian

Football 5-a-side 

Argentina qualified for the Paralympics by finishing second the 2015 Parapan American Games in Toronto, Canada and the IBSA Blind Football World Championships in Tokyo, Japan.  Both finishes were behind host nation, Brazil, who earned an automatic qualifying berth.

Group B

Semifinal

Bronze medal match

Football 7-a-side 

Argentina qualified for the Paralympics through the 2015 Parapan American Games in Toronto after Iran's qualifying spot was withdrawn because of a lack of competitors in their region.

The draw for the tournament was held on May 6 at the  2016 Pre Paralympic Tournament in Salou, Spain.  Argentina was put into Group B with the United States, Netherlands and Russia. Iran qualified for the 2016 Rio Games following the suspension of Russia.  The IPC ruled that there could not be a redraw for the groups.  This resulted in Iran being put into Group A with the Netherlands, Argentina and the United States.

The tournament where the Paralympic draw took place featured 7 of the 8 teams participating in Rio.  It was the last major preparation event ahead of the Rio Games for all teams participating.  Argentina finished 7th after losing placement matches to the United States 4 - 3 and Ireland 0 - 3.

Going into the Rio Games, the country was ranked sixth in the world.

Group B

Classification 5/6

Judo 

Five Argentine judoka have qualified to the 2016 Summer Paralympics. The competitions took place at the Carioca Arena 3

Men

Women

Paracanoeing

Argentina earned a qualifying spot at the 2016 Summer Paralympics in this sport following their performance at the 2015 ICF Canoe Sprint & Paracanoe World Championships in Milan, Italy where the top six finishers in each Paralympic event earned a qualifying spot for their nation. Lucas Nicolas Diaz earned the spot for Argentina after finishing fourth in the men's KL1 event. The competition took place at Lagoa Stadium.

Powerlifting

Argentina has qualified one athlete to compete at the 2016 Summer Paralympics in Rio de Janeiro. The competition will take place at Riocentro. Jose David Coronel previously competed at the 2012 Summer Paralympic Games in the 75 kg category.

Rowing

Argentina has qualified one rower to compete at the 2016 Summer Paralympics in Rio de Janeiro. The competition will take place at Rodrigo de Freitas Lagoon.

Qualification Legend: FA=Final A (medal); FB=Final B (non-medal); R=Repechage

Sailing

One pathway for qualifying for Rio involved having a boat have top seven finish at the 2015 Combined World Championships in a medal event where the country had nor already qualified through via the 2014 IFDS Sailing World Championships.  Argentina qualified for the 2016 Games under this criteria in the 2.4m event with a sixteenth-place finish overall and the sixth country who had not qualified via the 2014 Championships.  The boat was crewed by Tomas Saez Raffaelli. Yet, the boat was crewed at the 2016 Games by Juan Fernández Ocampo, who previously competed at the 2012 Summer Paralympic Games.

Swimming

Argentina has qualified 11 Paralympic swimmers to the 2016 Summer Paralympic Games, which will compete in various events at the Olympic Aquatics Stadium in Rio de Janeiro.

Men

Women

Table tennis

Men

Women

Wheelchair basketball

The Argentina women's national wheelchair basketball team has qualified for the 2016 Rio Paralympics. As hosts, Brazil got to choose which group they were put into.  They were partnered with Algeria, who would be put in the group they did not chose.  Brazil chose Group A, which included Canada, Germany, Great Britain and Argentina.  Algeria ended up in Group B with the United States, the Netherlands, France and China.

Group A

Wheelchair tennis 
Argentina qualified three competitors in the men's single event, Ezequiel Casco, Gustavo Fernandez and Agustin Ledesma.  Fernandez was the Parapan American Games champion.

See also
Argentina at the 2016 Summer Olympics

References

Nations at the 2016 Summer Paralympics
2016
2016 in Argentine sport